Neohaustator fortilirata is a species of sea snail, a marine gastropod mollusk in the family Turritellidae.

Description

Distribution

References

 Sowerby, G. B. III, 1914, Descriptions of fifteen new Japanese Marine Molluscs. Ann. Mag. Nat. Hist. Ser. 8, 14, July, 1914 page(s): 36
 Hasegawa K. (2009) Upper bathyal gastropods of the Pacific coast of northern Honshu, Japan, chiefly collected by R/V Wakataka-maru. In: T. Fujita (ed.), Deep-sea fauna and pollutants off Pacific coast of northern Japan. National Museum of Nature and Science Monographs 39: 225–383.

Turritellidae
Gastropods described in 1914